"Georgia Keeps Pulling on My Ring" is a single co-written and originally recorded by Little David Wilkins. It was released in 1974, peaking at number 50 on the U.S. country singles charts.

It was later covered American country music artist Conway Twitty. It was released in October 1977 as the first single and title track from his album Georgia Keeps Pulling on My Ring. The song peaked at number 3 on the Billboard Hot Country Singles chart. It also reached number 1 on the RPM Country Tracks chart in Canada.

Chart performance

Little David Wilkins

Conway Twitty

References

1974 singles
1977 singles
Little David Wilkins songs
Conway Twitty songs
Song recordings produced by Owen Bradley
MCA Records singles
1974 songs
Songs written by Little David Wilkins